You Could Look It Up is a book of essays on the history of reference works by Rutgers University English professor Jack Lynch.

References

External links
 

2016 non-fiction books
Works about information
Bloomsbury Publishing books
Essay collections